Cameraria fara is a moth of the family Gracillariidae. It is found in Cameroon. The habitat consists of riparian woodland with high standing grass.

The forewing ground colour is ochreous with dirty white/black markings consisting of three transverse fasciae, one costal patch and one dorsal strigula and marked blackish-fuscous at the tornus. The hindwings are dirty white with a golden shine along the costal margin. Adults have been recorded on wing at the end of November.

Etymology
The specific name refers to the Faro River, the floodplain of which is the type locality.

References

Endemic fauna of Cameroon
Moths described in 2012
fara
Insects of Cameroon
Moths of Africa

Taxa named by Jurate de Prins